Boris Alexander Nachamkin (December 6, 1933 – February 14, 2018) was an American former professional basketball player.

Nachamkin was born in Brooklyn, New York, the son of Russian immigrants, and was Jewish. He played basketball for Thomas Jefferson High School. He then played college basketball for the New York University Violets men's basketball team.

He played in the 1953 Maccabiah Games in Israel, winning a gold medal with the US team.

Nachamkin was selected in the 1954 NBA Draft (second round, 16th overall) by the Rochester Royals. He played for the Royals in 1954 as a forward and averaged 3.3 points, 3.2 rebounds and 0.5 assists per contest in six career games.

See also
 List of select Jewish basketball players

References

External links
 JewsinSports.org – Boris Nachamkin
 TheDraftReview entry

1933 births
2018 deaths
Basketball players from New York City
Jewish men's basketball players
Maccabiah Games gold medalists for the United States
Maccabiah Games medalists in basketball
Competitors at the 1953 Maccabiah Games
NYU Violets men's basketball players
Rochester Royals draft picks
Rochester Royals players
Small forwards
Sportspeople from Brooklyn
Thomas Jefferson High School (Brooklyn) alumni
American men's basketball players